Nonthaburi Youth Centre Stadium is a multi-purpose stadium in Nonthaburi province, Thailand.  It is currently used mostly for football matches.  The stadium holds 6,000 people.

Football venues in Thailand
Multi-purpose stadiums in Thailand
Buildings and structures in Nonthaburi province
Sport in Nonthaburi province